Ernest Victor Hareux (18 February 1847, Paris - 16 February 1909, Grenoble) was a French painter of landscapes and genre scenes.

Biography 
He displayed a talent for drawing at the age of ten, and studied with several well known artists, including , Émile Bin and Léon Germain Pelouse. His first exhibition at the Salon was in 1868, and  he gave regular showings there throughout his life; receiving a third-class medal in 1880. He was named a member of the Société des Artistes Français in 1883.

Occasionally, he painted in Normandy, and in La Creuse, where he joined the École de Crozant and met Laurent Guétal, a priest and painter, who invited him to Grenoble in 1887. The frequent bad weather there prevented him from painting, and he became discouraged, but returned again the following year.

He eventually came to favor painting in the mountains; befriending Théodore Ravanat, and other members of the artists' colony at Proveysieux.

In 1906, he was named a Knight in the Légion of Honor.

References

Further reading 
 Émile Bellier de La Chavignerie and Louis Auvray, Dictionnaire général des artistes de l'école française depuis l'origine des arts du dessin jusqu'à nos jours, Paris, Librairie Renouard, Vol.1, 1882
 Valérie Huss (Ed.), Grenoble et ses artistes au au xixe siècle, exhibition catalog, Musée de Grenoble, 2020

External links 

 More works by Hareux @ ArtNet
 Works by Hareux @ the Base Joconde

1847 births
1909 deaths
19th-century French painters
French landscape painters
French genre painters
Recipients of the Legion of Honour
Painters from Paris
20th-century French painters